In organic chemistry, a vinyl sulfone is a functional group consisting of a vinyl group bonded to a sulfone group. Specific compounds containing this functional group are divinyl sulfone, phenyl vinyl sulfone, methyl vinyl sulfone, and ethyl vinyl sulfone.

The sulfone makes the vinyl group electrophilic, allowing it to be used as a pharmacophore for binding to the thiol of cysteine residues. This same reactive nature is responsible for their major industrial use in vinyl sulfone dyes.

Uses
Vinyl sulfone has uses as a molluscicide pesticide.

Phenyl vinyl sulfone has been applied to ruthenium chemistry as part of olefin metathesis reactions.

Vinyl sulfone has applications to protein purification, especially when linked with mercaptoethanol.

References

Sulfones
Pesticides
Medicinal chemistry
Dienes
Vinyl compounds